György Fináczy (born 25 May 1942) is a Hungarian sailor. He competed at the 1964 Summer Olympics and the 1972 Summer Olympics.

References

External links
 

1942 births
Living people
Hungarian male sailors (sport)
Olympic sailors of Hungary
Sailors at the 1964 Summer Olympics – Finn
Sailors at the 1972 Summer Olympics – Finn
Sportspeople from Budapest